Under the same format as the 2003 European Nations Cup, six nations participated in two groups of three, each playing a total of two games.

England were crowned European champions for the third successive time after they defeated Ireland in the final.

Group 1

Results

Final standings

Ireland advanced to the final.

Group 2

Results

Final standings

England advanced to the final.

Final

References

European Nations Cup
European Nations Cup
European Nations Cup
European Nations Cup
European Nations Cup
European Nations Cup
European Nations Cup
European Nations Cup